Cameron Michael Jowitt (born 5 February 1983) is a Samoan/New Zealand Rugby Union footballer who played Rugby in Ireland for Leinster Rugby.

Jowitt has won the Heineken Cup and the Celtic League with Leinster. He signed with the NSW Waratahs for the 2010 Super 14 season.

References

1983 births
Leinster Rugby players
Living people
New Zealand rugby union players